Daniel Gureasko Bobrow (29 November 1935 – 20 March 2017) was an American computer scientist who created an oft-cited artificial intelligence program STUDENT, with which he earned his PhD., worked at BBN Technologies (BBN), then was a Research Fellow in the Intelligent Systems Laboratory of the Palo Alto Research Center.

Born in New York City, he earned his BS from RPI in 1957, SM from Harvard in 1958, and PhD in Mathematics from MIT under the supervision of Marvin Minsky in 1964. At BBN, he was a developer of TENEX.

Bobrow was the president of the American Association for Artificial Intelligence (AAAI), chair of the Cognitive Science Society, Editor-in-chief of the journal Artificial Intelligence.  He shared the 1992 ACM Software System Award with five other PARC scientists (Richard R. Burton, L. Peter Deutsch, Ronald Kaplan, Larry Masinter, and Warren Teitelman)  for his work on Interlisp. He was an ACM Fellow and a AAAI fellow.

Further reading

 Rusty Bobrow (Daniel's brother), "Danny Bobrow: A Personal Recollection", AI Magazine 38:4:85-86 (2017) full text

References

1935 births
2017 deaths
American computer scientists
Harvard University alumni
Fellows of the Association for the Advancement of Artificial Intelligence
Massachusetts Institute of Technology School of Science alumni
Rensselaer Polytechnic Institute alumni
Scientists at PARC (company)
Fellows of the Association for Computing Machinery
Presidents of the Association for the Advancement of Artificial Intelligence
Lisp (programming language) people